The 2012 Fresno State Bulldogs football team represented California State University, Fresno in the 2012 NCAA Division I FBS football season. The Bulldogs were led by first-year head coach Tim DeRuyter and played their home games at Bulldog Stadium. This was their first year as a member of the Mountain West Conference. They finished the season 9–4, 7–1 in Mountain West play to share the conference championship with Boise State and San Diego State. They were invited to the Hawaii Bowl where they were defeated by SMU.

Personnel

Coaching staff

Roster

Depth chart

Schedule

Game summaries

Weber State

at Oregon

Colorado

at Tulsa

Last meeting was in the 2005 Liberty Bowl.

San Diego State

at Colorado State

Last meeting was in the 2008 New Mexico Bowl.

at Boise State

Wyoming

Last meeting was in the 2009 New Mexico Bowl.

at New Mexico

Hawaii

at Nevada

Air Force

Last meeting was in the 2000 Silicon Valley Classic.

SMU–Hawaii Bowl

Awards and honors
 Quarterback Derek Carr was named Mountain West Conference’s Offensive Player of the Year. 
 Strong-safety Phillip Thomas was named the Mountain West Conference’s Defensive Player of the Year, and was a unanimous All-American. 
 Wide-receiver Davante Adams was named the Mountain West Conference’s Freshman of the Year.

References

Fresno State
Fresno State Bulldogs football seasons
Mountain West Conference football champion seasons
Fresno State Bulldogs football